Sebastián Gutiérrez (born September 10, 1974) is a Venezuelan film director, screenwriter and film producer. He wrote the screenplays to the films Gothika, Snakes on a Plane, The Eye and The Big Bounce, and wrote and directed two independent ensemble comedies, Women in Trouble and Elektra Luxx. 

Gutiérrez has also won the Critics' Award at the Festival du Film Policier de Cognac for his directorial debut Judas Kiss.

In 2019, the Cinemax series Jett he created premiered, and he also wrote, directed as well as executive produced all of its episodes.

Career
Gutiérrez wrote and directed one of the first motion pictures made expressly for internet distribution, the ensemble crime comedy Girl Walks into a Bar, starring Carla Gugino, Rosario Dawson, Robert Forster, Danny DeVito, Josh Hartnett and Alexis Bledel, among others.  Gutiérrez cowrote a song for the film, "Only Bad Can Come", with composer Grant Lee Phillips.

As a screenwriter, he has written Gothika,  Snakes on a Plane, The Eye, The Big Bounce and Hotel Noir.

He has written and directed two independent female-driven ensemble comedies, Women in Trouble and Elektra Luxx, revolving around a group of Los Angeles women.  The two movies are part of a trilogy with the third movie already announced, Women In Ecstasy. Carla Gugino stars as the namesake character Elektra Luxx, a recently retired porn star trying to figure out how to lead a "normal" life, along with Connie Britton, Julianne Moore, Joseph Gordon-Levitt, Josh Brolin, Simon Baker, Emmanuelle Chriqui and Adrianne Palicki.

He is also the creator of the Cinemax crime drama TV series Jett, as well as the writer, director and executive producer of all of its episodes, which debuted in 2019 and stars Carla Gugino as the title character, a skilled ex-professional thief named Daisy "Jett" Kowalski.

Recurring actors
Gutiérrez usually works with a revolving company of actors which include:
 Carla Gugino, who plays the lead in many of Gutierrez's films (Judas Kiss, She Creature, Women in Trouble, Elektra Luxx, Girl Walks into a Bar, Hotel Noir, Elizabeth Harvest, Jett)
 Robert Forster plays roles in Rise: Blood Hunter, Girl Walks into a Bar, Hotel Noir
 Joseph Gordon-Levitt has roles in Women in Trouble, Elektra Luxx
 Simon Baker stars in Judas Kiss, Women in Trouble
 Danny DeVito stars in Girl Walks into a Bar, Hotel Noir
 Gil Bellows plays roles in Judas Kiss, She Creature, Girl Walks into a Bar, Jett
 Emmanuelle Chriqui stars in Women in Trouble, Elektra Luxx, Girl Walks into a Bar
 Rosario Dawson stars in Girl Walks into a Bar, Hotel Noir
 Rufus Sewell stars in She Creature, Hotel Noir

Personal life
Since 1996, Gutiérrez has been in a relationship with his collaborator, actress Carla Gugino. Gugino stated in 2009 that they had no plans to marry, commenting, "Marriage isn't important for us. We like being boyfriend and girlfriend; there's something sexy and fun about that. We're very much about, 'There’s nothing holding us here other than our desire to be together.'"

Filmography

Film

Executive producer
 3 Days in Havana (2013)

Television

Acting roles

Awards and nominations
 Won – 1999 Critics Award for Judas Kiss // Cognac Festival du Film Policier, France
 Nominated – 1999 Grand Prix for Judas Kiss // Paris Film Festival, France

References

External links

1974 births
People from Caracas
Venezuelan expatriates in the United States
Venezuelan film directors
Venezuelan screenwriters
Living people